Arūnas Šuika (born 16 May 1970) is a Lithuanian former international footballer and now coach that played as midfielder. He played several years for FK Atlantas before moving in 1995 to Denmark to play for Lyngby Boldklub. He finished his career in his all time team, FK Atlantas.

International career
Šuika made 18 appearances for the Lithuania national football team between 1995 and 1997.

References

 

1970 births
Living people
Lithuanian footballers
Lithuania international footballers
Lyngby Boldklub players
Silkeborg IF players
Sportspeople from Klaipėda
Lithuanian football managers
FK Atlantas managers
Association football midfielders